Bob Mowat (born October 5, 1949) is a Canadian former professional ice hockey right winger.

Mowat played one season in World Hockey Association for the Phoenix Roadrunners during the 1974–75 WHA season. He was born in Kamloops, British Columbia.

External links
 

1949 births
Canadian ice hockey right wingers
Charlotte Checkers (EHL) players
Ice hockey people from British Columbia
Living people
Phoenix Roadrunners (WHA) players
Phoenix Roadrunners (WHL) players
Sportspeople from Kamloops
Tulsa Oilers (1964–1984) players
Winnipeg Jets (WHL) players
Canadian expatriate ice hockey players in the United States